Isanthrene basifera is a moth of the subfamily Arctiinae. It was described by Francis Walker in 1865. It is found in Colombia.

References

 

Euchromiina
Moths described in 1865